Kit Carson (1809–1868) was an American frontiersman.

Kit Carson may also refer to:

Places 
 Kit Carson, Colorado, a Statutory Town in Cheyenne County
 Kit Carson County, Colorado
 Kit Carson Peak, Colorado
 Kit Carson Park, a municipal park in Escondido, California
 Mount Kit Carson, northeast of Spokane, Washington

Films 
 Kit Carson (1903 film), one of the first Westerns
 Kit Carson (1928 film), an American Western silent film
 Kit Carson (1940 film), starring Jon Hall

People 
 Kit Carson (baseball) (1912–1983), American Major League Baseball player
 Leonard K. Carson (1923–1994), a.k.a., "Kit Carson", American fighter ace
 L. M. Kit Carson (1941–2014), American actor and screenwriter
 Michael "Kit" Carson (1943/4–2019), English football coach and alleged child sex abuser implicated in United Kingdom football sexual abuse scandal
 Harold J. "Kit" Carson, American knifemaker and member of the Blade Cutlery Hall of Fame
 Homer Lloyd "Kit" Carson, Johnny Carson's father

Characters 
 Kit Carson, from the Italian comics series Tex
 Kit Carson, from the Time Scout series by Robert Lynn Asprin

Other uses 
 Kit Carson Correctional Center, a privately owned state prison in Kit Carson County, Colorado

See also 
The Adventures of Kit Carson, 1951–1955 American television series
Kit Carson Scouts, members of a U.S. Marine Corps program for former Viet Cong during the Vietnam War

Carson, Kit